Les Casse Pieds is a 1948 French comedy film directed by Jean Dréville.

It was shot at the Saint-Maurice Studios in Paris.

Reception
The film was the fifth most popular movie at the French box office in 1949.

References

External links

1948 films
1940s French-language films
1948 comedy films
French comedy films
Films directed by Jean Dréville
French black-and-white films
1940s French films